The project Zemships (Zero Emissions Ships) developed the  FCS Alsterwasser, a 100 person hydrogen-power passenger ship, power-assisted by an electric motor that gets its electricity from a fuel cell. The first boat operates on the Alster in Hamburg since 2008. The keel laying at the SSB shipyard in Oortkaten was on 4 December 2007.

Refueling
The hydrogen station will be a storage tank with 17,000 liters of hydrogen for refueling. Compression is done with an ionic liquid piston compressor.

Specifications
Boat for 100 passengers, 25.56 m long, 5.2 m wide, electric motor 100 kW, a hydrogen storage tank 350 bars, with two 48 kW PEM fuel cells (140 V DC) and an integrated battery (7 x 80 V, 360 Ah).

See also
 Nemo H2
 Hydrogen ship
 Clean Urban Transport for Europe
 Zero Regio
 Germanischer Lloyd guidelines for fuel cells on ships and boats

References

External links
Zemships homepage
Fuel Cell
HY
Zero Regio about Zemships

Hydrogen ships
Passenger ships